Enrique Sánchez (born 1909, date of death unknown) was a Mexican sprinter. He competed in the men's 200 metres at the 1932 Summer Olympics.

References

External links
 

1909 births
Year of death missing
Athletes (track and field) at the 1932 Summer Olympics
Mexican male sprinters
Olympic athletes of Mexico
Athletes from Mexico City
Central American and Caribbean Games medalists in athletics
Central American and Caribbean Games silver medalists for Mexico
Competitors at the 1938 Central American and Caribbean Games
20th-century Mexican people